Strasburg is an unincorporated town, just 30 minutes east of downtown Denver along the I-70 corridor. It is home to Strasburg School District 31-J with an enrollment of 1209 students. There are several small businesses, medical clinics, a post office, and is a census-designated place (CDP) located in and governed by Adams and Arapahoe counties, Colorado, United States. The CDP is a part of the Denver–Aurora–Lakewood, CO Metropolitan Statistical Area. The Strasburg post office has the ZIP Code 80136. At the United States Census 2010, the population of the Strasburg CDP was 2,447, while the population of the 80136 ZIP Code Tabulation Area was 4834 including adjacent communities.

History
The community was named after John Strasburg, a railroad official. Strasburg may now be considered a commuter community as new housing continues to be built and much of the populace works in the surrounding areas of Aurora, Brighton, and Denver.

The town is built next to the Comanche Crossing of the Kansas Pacific Railroad. A post office called Strasburg has been in operation since 1908.

Geography

Demographics

Education
The Strasburg School District 31J serves Strasburg.

The Strasburg High School Indians are one of only two schools in the state to retain their indigenous mascot. This mutual respectful partnership with the Northern Arapahoe Nation is highly rooted in authentic traditions and education. 

CPR Article-Rural Strasburg High School teaches Indigenous traditions with help from Northern Arapaho Tribe

See also

Outline of Colorado 
Index of Colorado-related articles
State of Colorado
Colorado cities and towns
Colorado census designated places
Colorado counties
Adams County, Colorado
Arapahoe County, Colorado
List of statistical areas in Colorado
Front Range Urban Corridor
North Central Colorado Urban Area
Denver-Aurora-Boulder, CO Combined Statistical Area
Denver-Aurora-Broomfield, CO Metropolitan Statistical Area

References

External links

Strasburg @ Colorado.com
Strasburg @ UncoverColorado.com
Strasburg 31J School District
Strasburg 31j School District History 
Strasburg Metropolitan Park & Recreation District
Adams County website
Arapahoe County website

Census-designated places in Adams County, Colorado
Census-designated places in Arapahoe County, Colorado
Census-designated places in Colorado
Denver metropolitan area